The Institute for Work & Health (IWH) is an independent, not-for-profit research organization based in Toronto, Canada. Its mission is to “promote, protect and improve the safety and health of working people by conducting actionable research that is valued by employers, workers, and policy-makers.”

Operations 
Since 2013, IWH has operated with core funding from the Government of Ontario through the Ministry of Labour (Ontario). For the 22 years previous to that, since its founding in 1990, the core funder was Ontario’s Workplace Safety and Insurance Board and its predecessors. The institute maintains an arm’s-length relationship with its core funder.
Institute scientists also apply for and receive grants from peer-reviewed funding agencies in Canada, such as the Canadian Institutes of Health Research and the Social Sciences and Humanities Research Council. 
IWH’s board of directors includes senior business, labour and academic representatives. A scientific advisory committee provides guidance on IWH research activities.
IWH has formal affiliations with four universities in Ontario, Canada: University of Toronto, University of Waterloo, McMaster University and York University. The institute has access to data sources from the Workplace Safety and Insurance Board and Statistics Canada.
IWH is part of the health and safety system in Ontario.

Research 
IWH research falls into two broad areas:
 the prevention of work-related injury and illness (primary prevention), which includes studies of programs, policies and practices, and the health of workers in the population at large; and
 the health and recovery of injured workers (secondary prevention), which involves research on treatment, return to work, disability prevention and management, and compensation policy.
IWH research focuses on these topics:
 work-related musculoskeletal disorders
 occupational health and safety practices
 vulnerable workers (such as newcomers, young workers, temporary workers)
 regulations and incentives
 working conditions and health
 return-to-work practices
 clinical treatment
 compensation and benefits
 measurement of health and function
accessibility of work places to people with disabilities 
IWH also conducts systematic reviews of occupational health and safety research. Systematic reviews provide an overview of the evidence from higher quality studies on a specific research question. Cochrane Back and Neck (formerly known as the Cochrane Back Review Group) is based at IWH and conducts systematic reviews of clinical research on back and neck pain.

In 2020, in the context of the COVID-19 pandemic, the institute published research on the impact of unsafe workplaces on worker's mental health.

Publications, tools and guides 
IWH has produced a number of tools and guides based on its research evidence, including:
 A Guide to Successful Participatory Ergonomics Programs
 Breakthrough Change Case Study Series
 Disabilities of the Arm, Shoulder and Hand (DASH) Outcome Measure
 eOfficeErgo: Ergonomics e-Learning for Office Workers
 IWH Organizational Performance Metric
 OHS Vulnerability Measure
 Opioid Manager
 Red Flags/Green Lights: A Guide to Identifying and Solving Return-to-Work Problems
 Seven Principles for Successful Return to Work 
 So Your Back Hurts …
 Prevention is the Best Medicine: A Tool Kit for Teaching Newcomers
IWH also produces regular newsletters, including
 IWH News, a monthly e-newsletter
 At Work, a quarterly newsletter
 Sharing Best Evidence, a periodic newsletter summarizing the results of a systematic review conducted by the institute
 Issue Briefing, a periodic newsletter on the policy implications of health, safety, disability and/or workers’ compensation research

References

External links 

 Institute for Work & Health
 Ontario Ministry of Labour
 Workplace Safety and Insurance Board
 Cochrane Back and Neck

Occupational safety and health organizations